Always prepared ( []) is the motto of the Pioneer movement , adopted by most of the Pioneer organizations in socialist countries. The motto is a common feature on the organizations' badges. The motto echoes the Scout motto, "Be Prepared." After the end of the Russian Civil War, the Scout organization of the former Tsarist Russia was reorganized into the Young Pioneers. The head of the Scouts, who supported the Red Army and the Komsomol, suggested the modified motto.  The Scout motto, in use since 1907, meant that Scouts needed to be physically and mentally ready. The "always ready" of the young pioneers is mostly related to socialism, peace and country building.

Background 
The motto of the Young Pioneers of the Soviet Union consisted of two parts, the summons and the answer or response (1986 revision is presented below).
Summons - Pioneer, to fight for the cause of the Communist Party of the Soviet Union, be prepared!.
Response - Always prepared!.
This, like other rituals and customs of the organization, reflected its origin in the Scouts movement (their motto is "Be Prepared").

Gallery

References 

Mottos
Pioneer movement